William Joseph McMurray (February 26, 1882 – January 26, 1945) was an American baseball catcher in the pre-Negro leagues. He played most of his seasons for the St. Paul Colored Gophers and the West Baden Sprudels.

He played with many popular players of the day, including George Shively, Candy Jim Taylor, Chappie Johnson, Dick Wallace, and William Binga.

References

External links

Baseball players from Missouri
1882 births
1945 deaths
St. Paul Colored Gophers players
West Baden Sprudels players
People from St. Louis
People from Chicago
20th-century African-American people